Dan Nicolae Nistor (born 6 May 1988) is a Romanian professional footballer who plays as a midfielder for Liga I club Universitatea Cluj.

After starting out in the lower leagues, Nistor totalled over 100 Liga I matches for Pandurii Târgu Jiu between 2010 and 2013, which earned him a transfer abroad to Evian during the latter year. He was used sparingly in France and soon returned to Pandurii, and has since spent his career with local clubs Dinamo București, CFR Cluj, Universitatea Craiova and Universitatea Cluj.

Nistor made his senior international debut for Romania in 2013, in a 4–0 victory over for Trinidad and Tobago.

Club career

Early years
Nistor did not play football at junior level, but in 2005 joined local AS Rucăr in the lower leagues. Around two years later, during a match against the reserves of Argeș Pitești, he impressed Internațional Curtea de Argeș owner Benone Lazăr who was in the attendance. Nistor was transferred to the latter club at the cost of seven football balls.

After his first season at Internațional in the third league, he was loaned to Muscelul Câmpulung and Dacia Mioveni respectively. On his return to Curtea de Argeș in 2010, Nistor had hoped he would make his Liga I debut, but the team withdrew from the championship due to financial issues.

Pandurii Târgu Jiu
Nistor signed a four-year contract with Pandurii Târgu Jiu in the summer of 2010. He played his first match in the top division on 23 July that year, featuring the full 90 minutes in a goalless draw with Unirea Urziceni. On 10 April 2011, he scored his first Liga I goal in a 4–2 home victory over Victoria Brănești.

He made 35 appearances and netted six goals all competition comprised in the 2012–13 season, as Pandurii finished second in the Liga I and subsequently qualified for the UEFA Europa League. Nistor made his debut in that competition on 16 July 2013, in a 0–0 away draw with Levadia Tallinn for the second qualifying round. His team went further after 4–0 on aggregate and he recorded his first European goal in a 1–1 draw against Hapoel Tel Aviv, on 1 August.

Evian
In August 2013, amid interest from FC Steaua București, CFR Cluj and Málaga, Nistor was transferred by French club Evian for a rumoured fee of €800,000. He failed to establish himself as a starter for Les Roses, and only played six matches in the Ligue 1 during the first half of the 2013–14 campaign. As a result, Nistor made a controversial statement about Evian's staff, saying that he did not play more because of his nationality.

Return to Pandurii Târgu Jiu
On 22 January 2014, Nistor was sent on loan to his former team Pandurii Târgu Jiu for a period of five months, which was later extended for another season. In the summer of 2015, he again joined the Alb-albaștrii, this time as a free agent.

Dinamo București
On 31 August 2016, Nistor agreed to a two-year deal with fellow league team Dinamo București. On 20 May 2017, he won his first career trophy after "the Red Dogs" came victorious 2–0 in the Cupa Ligii final against ACS Poli Timișoara.

CFR Cluj
Nistor moved to CFR Cluj on 10 July 2017 in a swap deal which took Filipe Nascimento in the opposite direction. Under the management of Dan Petrescu, he played 18 games across all competitions without scoring. However, in January 2018 he publicly expressed his dissatisfaction with Petrescu's communication skills and his recent lack of playing time.

Return to Dinamo București
Nistor terminated his contract with CFR Cluj and rejoined Dinamo București on 13 January 2018. He was assigned the number 10 shirt and played his first match upon return on 4 February, in a 2–2 Liga I draw with CS Universitatea Craiova.

On 29 July 2018, Nistor scored in an Eternal derby with FCSB, which ended 3–3. The following month, FCSB reportedly made several bids for the transfer of the midfielder—Dinamo however rejected each offer and proceeded in contract extension talks. Nistor registered 13 assists across the 2018–19 league season, the most for a player in the previous ten years, and was selected by Liga Profesionistă de Fotbal in the best team of the campaign.

Universitatea Craiova
On 6 January 2020, Nistor signed a -year contract with CS Universitatea Craiova for an undisclosed transfer fee. He made his debut on the 31st in a 3–1 Liga I victory over Gaz Metan Mediaș, and scored his first goals in a 2–3 Cupa României loss to Politehnica Iași on 4 March.

On 23 June, on the second match subsequent to the resumption of the Liga I after the Coronavirus pandemic, Nistor scored his first goal in the championship for Craiova in a 2–1 home defeat of FC Botoșani. He then converted the winning penalty in a 2–1 victory over FCSB, on 12 July. On 3 August, Nistor opened the scoring in an eventual 1–3 home loss to CFR Cluj; The final fixture loss meant that Craiova finished second in the table, while his former club CFR won its third title in a row.

International career
On 4 June 2013, Nistor made his international debut for the Romania national team in a 4–0 victory over Trinidad and Tobago at the Arena Națională in Bucharest, after having previously played in two unofficial friendlies against Belgium and Poland respectively.

His next caps for the nation only came during late 2019 under manager Cosmin Contra, appearing as a substitute in both UEFA Euro 2020 qualifiers against Norway and Spain.

Personal life
In February 2012, Nistor was caught driving an Audi A5 without a license and fined accordingly.

He has been married since June 2013, with fellow footballer Mihai Pintilii acting as best man. His spouse Cosmina gave birth to a son in April 2017.

Career statistics

International

Honours

Internațional Curtea de Argeș
Liga III: 2007–08

Pandurii Târgu Jiu
Cupa Ligii runner-up: 2014–15

Dinamo București
Cupa Ligii: 2016–17

CFR Cluj
Liga I: 2017–18

Universitatea Craiova
Cupa României: 2020–21
Supercupa României: 2021

Individual
Liga I Team of the Season: 2019–20

References
Notes

Citations

External links

1988 births
Living people
People from Argeș County
Romanian footballers
Association football midfielders
Liga I players
Liga II players
FC Internațional Curtea de Argeș players
CS Mioveni players
CS Pandurii Târgu Jiu players
Ligue 1 players
Thonon Evian Grand Genève F.C. players
FC Dinamo București players
CFR Cluj players
CS Universitatea Craiova players
FC Universitatea Cluj players
Romania international footballers
Romanian expatriate footballers
Expatriate footballers in France
Romanian expatriate sportspeople in France